The 1920 German Ice Hockey Championship was the fourth season of the German Ice Hockey Championship, the national championship of Germany. Three teams participated in the championship, and Berliner Schlittschuhclub won the title.

Final standings

References

External links
German ice hockey standings 1912-1932

Ger
German Ice Hockey Championship seasons